Kotter or Kötter may refer to:

 Kötter, a type of European cottager

People with the surname
 John Kotter (born 1947), American academic and business author
 Ernst Kötter (1859–1922), German mathematician
 Hans Kotter (1480–1541), German composer and organist
 Kim Kötter (born 1982), Dutch beauty queen
 Klaus Kotter (1934–2010), German president of the International Bobsleigh and Skeleton Federation

See also
 Welcome Back, Kotter, a TV show
 Kottler (disambiguation), a surname
 Cotter (disambiguation)
 Kotte (surname)